Joshua Frederick Hook (born 9 January 1993) is an endurance world champion motorcycle racer from Australia. Currently competing in the FIM Endurance World Championship with F.C.C. TSR Honda France. He was the winner of 2011 Australia 125GP Championship on Aprilia.

Career

Early career
Born in Taree, New South Wales, Hook started riding at the age of 14 months. He started dirt track riding in 2005, then moved to road racing in 2008, where he ranked 3rd in the MRRDA series nationally. Hook was selected to compete in the Red Bull MotoGP Rookies Cup in Europe in 2009 and 2010, finishing the seasons 19th and 12th respectively. Hook showed his diversity by also ranking 3rd nationally on a Honda CBR600, in the FX 600 Championship. In the 2012 season, he rode for Team Honda Australia in the Australia Supersport 600 category, finishing second. Hook also competed in the Petronas Asia Dream Cup throughout Asia, finishing third. His first season on a Superbike in 2013 saw him finish 5th in ASBK and 5th again in 2014 in ASC. He moved to the MFJ All Japan Road Race JSB1000 Championship for the 2015 season and finished 11th overall on his Honda CBR1000RR; he also finished second alongside Dominique Aegerter and Kyle Smith in the 2015 Suzuka 8 Hours endurance race. He also participated in Moto2 replacing an injured Aegerter for the last four races of the season, with a best result of 20th on home soil at Phillip Island.

Superbike World Championship
Hook joined the Grillini Racing Team for the  season, partnering Dominic Schmitter in the Kawasaki Ninja ZX-10R-equipped team. However, Hook missed the start of the season due to a pre-season injury.

Career statistics

Grand Prix motorcycle racing

By season

By class

Races by year
(key) (Races in bold indicate pole position, races in italics indicate fastest lap)

Supersport World Championship

Races by year
(key) (Races in bold indicate pole position, races in italics indicate fastest lap)

Superbike World Championship

Races by year
(key) (Races in bold indicate pole position, races in italics indicate fastest lap)

Suzuka 8 Hours results

References

External links
 
 Profile on teamhondaracing.com.au

Australian motorcycle racers
Living people
1993 births
125cc World Championship riders
Supersport World Championship riders
Moto2 World Championship riders
Superbike World Championship riders
British Superbike Championship riders
MotoE World Cup riders
People from Taree
Racing drivers from New South Wales